The Austin International Poetry Festival was an unjuried four-day poetry festival involving poetry readings, workshops, open mics, poetry slams, and haiku.  Established in 1995, API published two Anthologies for the festival. These were di-vêrseʹ-city (Adult Anthology) and di-vêrseʹ-city Youth Anthology - which were also read by the poets during poetry readings at the festival.

References

External links

 AIPF facebook page

Poetry festivals in the United States
Festivals in Austin, Texas